The Method is the second full-length album by New York hardcore band, Killing Time. It was recorded between June and August 1996 and released on Blackout Records in April 1997. It was the band's first full-length release since 1989's Brightside, but the band split up soon after its release, despite its success in the hardcore punk field. Drago is now a police officer, Comunale works in the field of finances, and the rest of the band are still involved in the scene – either playing with bands, or managing and producing them.

The band's previous effort had been a 1992 EP, Happy Hour – the title track of which they re-recorded for this release – and a 1995 EP, Unavoidable, which contained versions of three of the songs on this album. Dean Rispler, bass player with fellow NYHC band, Murphy's Law co-produced the album with the band. The album also contains a cover version of a Major Conflict track, "Outgroup".

Overview
Seven years on from Brightside and it would seem the band have not changed. The songs are, once again, short and brutal with not a single one clocking in at over three minutes. However, they had coped with the rejection and apathy towards their 1992 Happy Hour EP material by extracting the good parts – the increased melody and technical guitar work – and combined it with the attitude and brutality of the Raw Deal/Brightside seminal material. The addition of a second guitarist in 1991 had allowed the band to expand the sound in the first place and on this album it serves to thicken the sound and allow for the odd – albeit short, but nevertheless appropriate – guitar solo. The band hadn't just gone for speed and brutality either with the inclusion of a few slower, more thoughtful tracks which is the band, kind of, saying, "Listen up! We can play both ways!".

Track listing
All songs written by Killing Time, unless stated
"Used to It" – 1:47
"It Must Be Nice" – 1:45
"Cayce" – 1:25
"Can't Get Around It" – 1:06
"Quietly" – 2:42
"Symptom" – 1:44
"The Method" – 2:30
"Outgroup" (Major Conflict) – 2:34
"Sidelined" – 2:33
"And I..." – 1:39
"Personal Hardcore" – 1:15
"Occupied" – 0:58
"Junkdrawer" – 2:41
"Scared" – 2:31
"Happy Hour" – 2:43
"Another Day" – 2:51
"Pokerface" – 1:58
"Are You Comfortable?" – 2:07

Credits
 Anthony Comunale – vocals
 Carl Porcaro – guitar
 Rich McLoughlin – guitar
 Sean O'Brien – bass
 Anthony Drago – drums
 Recorded June – August, 1996 at LoHo Studio, New York City, USA
 Produced by Dean Rispler and Killing Time
 Engineered by Joe Hogan
 Mixed by Victor Luke
 Cover painting by Chris Cannon

External links
Blackout Records band page
Blackout Records The Method page
Blackout Records Unavoidable EP page
Blackout Records Happy Hour EP page

1997 albums
Killing Time (American band) albums